After Muller's classification was described as an isomorph, or gene mutation that expresses a nonsense point mutant with expression identical to the original allele.

Therefore, in respect of the relationships between the original and mutated genes it is difficult to ascertain the effects of dominanceness or/and recessiveness.

Muller’s classification of mutant alleles

See also
Allele
Mutation
Muller's morphs

References

Mutation